The Treaty of Kraków was signed on 8 April 1525 between the Kingdom of Poland and the Grand Master of the Teutonic Knights. It officially ended the Polish–Teutonic War.

The treaty gave Grand Master Albert of Hohenzollern enough autonomy to secede from the Order to become Duke of the new Duchy of Prussia created by secularization of the Monastic state of the Teutonic Knights. This was sealed by the Prussian Homage of 10 April.

References

External links
Scan of the treaty (IEG Mainz)
Annotaded edition of the treaty (IEG Mainz)

History of Kraków
Krakow
Krakow 1525
Germany–Poland relations
1525 in Poland
1525 treaties
Polish–Teutonic War (1519–1521)